Krasnoyarovo is a rural locality (a selo) and the administrative center of Krasnoyarovsky Selsoviet of Mazanovsky District, Amur Oblast, Russia. The population was 981 as of 2018. There are 15 streets.

Geography 
Krasnoyarovo is located on the left bank of the Zeya River, 46 km southwest of Novokiyevsky Uval (the district's administrative centre) by road. Leontyevka is the nearest rural locality.

References 

Rural localities in Mazanovsky District